Psalm 14 is the 14th psalm of the Book of Psalms, beginning in English in the King James Version: "The fool hath said in his heart, There is no God." In the Greek Septuagint and the Latin Vulgate, it is psalm 13 in a slightly different numbering, "Dixit insipiens in corde suo". Its authorship is traditionally assigned to King David. With minor differences, it is nearly identical in content with Psalm 53. Hermann Gunkel dates the psalm to the exile period.

The psalm forms a regular part of Jewish, Catholic, Lutheran, Anglican and other Protestant liturgies. It has been paraphrased in hymns such as Luther's "Es spricht der Unweisen Mund wohl".

Text

Hebrew Bible version 
The following is the Hebrew text of Psalm 14:

King James Version 
The fool hath said in his heart, There is no God. They are corrupt, they have done abominable works, there is none that doeth good.
The Lord looked down from heaven upon the children of men, to see if there were any that did understand, and seek God.
They are all gone aside, they are all together become filthy: there is none that doeth good, no, not one.
Have all the workers of iniquity no knowledge? who eat up my people as they eat bread, and call not upon the Lord.
There were they in great fear: for God is in the generation of the righteous.
Ye have shamed the counsel of the poor, because the Lord is his refuge.
Oh that the salvation of Israel were come out of Zion! when the Lord bringeth back the captivity of his people, Jacob shall rejoice, and Israel shall be glad.

Additional passage
There is an additional passage after verse 3 which is present in the Septuagint, the Vulgate, and one Hebrew manuscript, but missing from the Masoretic text and from Psalm 53. The passage (and verses 2 and 3) is quoted in full in Romans 3:13-18, taken from the Septuagint. The Hebrew of this passage, including verse 3, reads:

Meaning
David is telling the audience that it is foolish to not believe in God. The opening statement says, "The fool hath said in his heart, There is no God." In the Bible when something or someone is referenced to being "foolish", this means that this person is "someone who disregards God's word". He refers to them as corrupt and does work that is hateful when it says "abominable". David is making it clear that without God, man cannot do any good because we have a sinful nature. One who does not believe in God, is susceptible to hatefulness and corrupt behavior.

According to some Christian exegesis, David begins to reference the return of Christ to retrieve his people. When he discusses the salvation of Israel and bringing them out of captivity, he is saying that the Lord will bring the ones who call on his name and are his believers to safety, away from the dominion of sin on the earth.

Uses

New Testament
Some verses of Psalm 14 are referenced in the New Testament. Verses 1c, 2b, 3 are quoted in Romans

Book of Common Prayer
In the Church of England's Book of Common Prayer, Psalm 14 is appointed to be read on the evening of the second day of the month.

Musical setting 
Martin Luther paraphrased Psalm 14 in a hymn in German "Es spricht der Unweisen Mund wohl" in 1524, one of the eight songs in the first Lutheran hymnal, Achtliederbuch. Heinrich Schütz wrote a setting of this text, SWV 110, as part of the Becker Psalter.

References

External links 

 
 
  in Hebrew and English - Mechon-mamre
 Text of Psalm 14 according to the 1928 Psalter
 For the leader. Of David. / The fool says in his heart, "There is no God." text and footnotes, usccb.org United States Conference of Catholic Bishops
 Psalm 14:1 introduction and text, biblestudytools.com
 Psalm 14 – Fallen Man and a Faithful God enduringword.com
 Psalm 14 / Refrain: The fear of the Lord is the beginning of wisdom. Church of England
 Psalm 14 at biblegateway.com
 Hymns for Psalm 14 hymnary.org

014
Works attributed to David